The Roman Catholic Archdiocese of Galveston–Houston (Latin: Archidiœcesis Galvestoniensis–Houstoniensis) is a Latin Church ecclesiastical jurisdiction or archdiocese of the Catholic Church in the United States. It encompasses  of ten counties in the southeastern area of Texas: Galveston, Harris, Austin, Brazoria, Fort Bend, Grimes, Montgomery, San Jacinto, Walker and Waller.

The chancery of the archdiocese is located in Downtown Houston. The archdiocese's first cathedral church is St. Mary Cathedral Basilica in Galveston, with a co-cathedral, the Co-Cathedral of the Sacred Heart, located in Downtown Houston. The co-cathedral is used for all major archdiocesan liturgies.

History

The archdiocesan history began with the erection of the prefecture apostolic of Texas in 1839, thus making Galveston the "Mother Church of Texas". The prefecture was elevated to a vicariate apostolic on July 10, 1841. On May 4, 1847, the vicariate became the Diocese of Galveston in the Province of New Orleans and St. Mary Cathedral Basilica was designated the cathedral.

In 1926, the then-diocese was placed in the newly created Province of San Antonio.

After the devastating Galveston Hurricane of 1900, Houston began to expand after the Port of Houston was completed. At the request of Wendelin J. Nold, fifth bishop of Galveston, Pope John XXIII authorised the construction of a co-cathedral of convenience in Houston, and on July 25, 1959, the name of the diocese was changed to the Diocese of Galveston–Houston. Sacred Heart, a parish church located in downtown Houston, was named the co-cathedral of the diocese. This change made Houston an episcopal see city, and permitted full episcopal ceremonies to be held in both Galveston and Houston.

In 1979, Pope John Paul II recognized the importance the diocese's cathedral played in the development of Texas and the western United States and elevated the status of St. Mary Cathedral by naming it a minor basilica.

By the end of the 20th century, the diocese had become one of the largest in the United States with its episcopal see cities becoming internationally important. Recognizing this, in December 2004, Pope John Paul II created the new Ecclesiastical Province of Galveston–Houston and elevated the See of Galveston–Houston to a metropolitan see. Bishop Joseph Fiorenza, who had led the diocese for 20 years, became the first Archbishop of Galveston–Houston, and Bishop Daniel DiNardo became Coadjutor Archbishop.

The Archdiocese of Galveston–Houston oversees the following suffragan dioceses: Austin, Beaumont, Brownsville, Corpus Christi, Tyler and Victoria in Texas.

Many landmark structures are contained within the archdiocese. Most prominent is St. Mary Cathedral Basilica, the mother church of Texas, and one of the few buildings and the only church to survive the 1900 Galveston Storm. Other landmarks include the 1887 Bishop's Palace, the former 1912 Sacred Heart Co-Cathedral, and Annunciation Church, one of the oldest churches in Texas.

There were 646,000 people of the Roman Catholic faith in the Galveston–Houston diocese in 1990. By 2005 this increased to 1.3 million, with 40% being Hispanic or Latino, 30% being non-Hispanic white, 19% being black, 7% being Asian, and 4% to miscellaneous racial identities. Immigration fueled the growth of Catholicism in the Houston area.

Bishops

Prefects of Texas
 John Timon, C.M. (1840–1847)

Vicars Apostolic of Texas
 Jean-Marie Odin, C.M. (1841–1847)

Bishops of Galveston
 Jean-Marie Odin, C.M. (1847–1861), appointed Archbishop of New Orleans
 Claude Marie Dubuis (1862–1892)
 Nicolaus Aloysius Gallagher (1892–1918)
 Christopher Edward Byrne (1918–1950)
 Wendelin Joseph Nold (1950–1959)
(Aloysius Joseph Meyer, C.M. was appointed apostolic administrator in 1881 but it did not take effect.  Bishop Gallagher, already listed above, became administrator.)

Bishops of Galveston–Houston
 Wendelin Joseph Nold (1959–1975)
 John Louis Morkovsky (1975–1984)
 Joseph Fiorenza (1984–2004)

Archbishops of Galveston–Houston
 Joseph Fiorenza (2004–2006)
 Cardinal Daniel DiNardo (2006–present)

Coadjutor Bishops
 Pierre Dufal, C.S.C. (1878–1879), resigned (did not succeed to see)
 John Louis Morkovsky (1963–1975)
 Daniel DiNardo (2003–2006), elevated to Coadjutor Archbishop in 2004; future Cardinal

Auxiliary Bishops
 John E. McCarthy (1979–1985), appointed Bishop of Austin
 Enrique San Pedro (1986–1991), appointed Coadjutor Bishop and later Bishop of Brownsville
 Curtis J. Guillory, SVD (1988–2000), appointed Bishop of Beaumont
 James Anthony Tamayo (1993–2000), appointed Bishop of Laredo
 Vincent M. Rizzotto (2001–2006)
 Joe S. Vásquez (2002–2010), appointed Bishop of Austin
 George Sheltz (2012–2021)
 Italo Dell’Oro (2021–present)

Other priests of this diocese who became bishops
John Claude Neraz, appointed Bishop of San Antonio in 1881
John Anthony Forest, appointed Bishop of San Antonio in 1895
Louis Joseph Reicher, appointed Bishop of Austin in 1947
Vincent Madeley Harris, appointed Bishop of Beaumont in 1966 and later Bishop of Austin
John Joseph Cassata, appointed Auxiliary Bishop of Dallas-Fort Worth in 1968 and later Bishop of Fort Worth
Patrick Fernandez Flores, appointed Auxiliary Bishop of San Antonio in 1970 and later Bishop of El Paso and Archbishop of San Antonio
Bernard James Ganter, appointed Bishop of Tulsa in 1972
Oscar Cantú, appointed Auxiliary Bishop of San Antonio in 2008, later Bishop of Las Cruces and Bishop of San Jose
Brendan John Cahill, appointed Bishop of Victoria in Texas in 2015

Coat of arms

The coat of arms of the Archdiocese of Galveston–Houston is composed of a blue fielded shield on which is displayed a scattering of silver and white roses and topped with a bishop's mitre.

The roses represent the Blessed Virgin Mary, in her title of the Mystical Rose, titular of the Cathedral-Basilica in the see city of Galveston. The red cross represents the Faith, with a square center containing a single silver star to represent Texas, the Lone Star State.

Statistics
Approximately 1.7 million Catholics live within the boundaries of the Archdiocese of Galveston–Houston (equaling 26% of the total population), making the archdiocese the largest in the state of Texas and the fifth largest in the United States. The archdiocese's 146 parishes are served by approximately 435 priests (193 diocesan, 195 religious, and 47 other) and 411 permanent deacons.

Parishes and churches

Education

As of 2018, the Catholic school network of the archdiocese is the largest private school network in the State of Texas. As of that year the archdiocese had 59 schools, with about 19,500 students enrolled.

In 2005 the school system had 17,000 students prior to Hurricane Katrina; the hurricane meant that an additional 1,700 attended Houston-area Catholic schools. From 2005 to 2012 total enrollment was consistently around 18,000. Several new schools were being established at the time. In 2012 it operated thirteen schools in the central areas of Houston; that year they had 2,000 students, with about 66% of the students being Catholic. The growth in Houston's Catholic school system contrasted with Catholic schooling systems in many other parts of the United States, which faced steep enrollment declines.

Sarah "Sally" Wilson Landram served as the superintendent of schools beginning in 2004. She was scheduled to retire on June 30, 2007, but fell ill with lung cancer and died at age 72 on June 28, 2007.

Significant structures

Province of Galveston–Houston

See List of Catholic Dioceses in the United States

Other Dioceses in the Ecclesiastical Province:

Diocese Of Corpus Christi

Diocese of Austin

Diocese of Brownsville

Diocese of Beaumont

Diocese of Victoria

Diocese of Tyler

See also

 Catholicism
 Christianity in Houston
 Galveston, Texas

References

External links

 - Previous official site domain
Schools office
St. Mary Cathedral Basilica

 
1847 establishments in Texas
Galveston-Houston
Religion in Galveston, Texas
Religion in Houston
Religious organizations established in 1847
Galveston
Galveston-Houston